In mathematics, the Abel–Jacobi map is a construction of algebraic geometry which relates an algebraic curve to its Jacobian variety. In Riemannian geometry, it is a more general construction mapping a manifold to its Jacobi torus.
The name derives from the theorem of Abel and Jacobi that two effective divisors are linearly equivalent if and only if they are indistinguishable under the Abel–Jacobi map.

Construction of the map

In complex algebraic geometry, the Jacobian of a curve C is constructed using path integration. Namely, suppose C has genus g, which means topologically that

 

Geometrically, this homology group consists of (homology classes of) cycles in C, or in other words, closed loops. Therefore, we can choose 2g loops  generating it. On the other hand, another more algebro-geometric way of saying that the genus of C is g is that

  

where K is the canonical bundle on C.

By definition, this is the space of globally defined holomorphic differential forms on C, so we can choose g linearly independent forms . Given forms and closed loops we can integrate, and we define 2g vectors

 

It follows from the Riemann bilinear relations that the  generate a nondegenerate lattice  (that is, they are a real basis for ), and the Jacobian is defined by

The Abel–Jacobi map is then defined as follows. We pick some base point  and, nearly mimicking the definition of  define the map

Changing base-point  does change the map, but only by a translation of the torus.

The Abel–Jacobi map of a Riemannian manifold

Let  be a smooth compact manifold. Let  be its fundamental group. Let  be its abelianisation map. Let  be the quotient by torsion. Let  be the composite homomorphism.

Definition. The cover  of the manifold  corresponding to the subgroup  is called the universal (or maximal) free abelian cover.

Now assume M has a Riemannian metric. By integrating an integral harmonic 1-form along paths from a basepoint , we obtain a map to the circle .

Similarly, in order to define a map  without choosing a basis for cohomology, we argue as follows. By integrating along the path , we obtain a linear form on : 

This gives rise a map 

 

which, furthermore, descends to a map

where  is the universal free abelian cover.

Definition.

Definition. The Abel–Jacobi map

is obtained from the map above by passing to quotients.

The Abel–Jacobi map is unique up to translations of the Jacobi torus. The map has applications in Systolic geometry. The Abel–Jacobi map of a Riemannian manifold shows up in the large time asymptotics of the heat kernel on a periodic manifold ( and ).

In much the same way, one can define a graph-theoretic analogue of Abel–Jacobi map as a piecewise-linear map from a finite graph into a flat torus (or a Cayley graph associated with a finite abelian group), which is closely related to asymptotic behaviors of random walks on crystal lattices, and can be used for design of crystal structures.

Abel–Jacobi theorem

The following theorem was proved by Abel: Suppose that

is a divisor (meaning a formal integer-linear combination of points of C). We can define

and therefore speak of the value of the Abel–Jacobi map on divisors.

 if and only if  is linearly equivalent to  This implies that the Abel-Jacobi map induces an injective map (of abelian groups) from the space of divisor classes of degree zero to the Jacobian.
Jacobi proved that this map is also surjective, so the two groups are naturally isomorphic.

The Abel–Jacobi theorem implies that the Albanese variety of a compact complex curve (dual of holomorphic 1-forms modulo periods) is isomorphic to its Jacobian variety (divisors of degree 0 modulo equivalence). For higher-dimensional compact projective varieties the Albanese variety and the Picard variety are dual but need not be isomorphic.

References

Algebraic curves
Riemannian geometry
Niels Henrik Abel